The Nimmo Clubhouse is a historic building in rural White County, Arkansas.  It is located on Nimmo Road, southeast of Kensett.  It is a single-story box-framed structure, with a metal roof, board-and-batten siding, and a foundation of concrete blocks.  Built about 1930 probably as a hunting lodge, it is one a few surviving examples in the county of Depression-era box frame construction.

The building was listed on the National Register of Historic Places in 1992.

See also
National Register of Historic Places listings in White County, Arkansas

References

Clubhouses on the National Register of Historic Places in Arkansas
Cultural infrastructure completed in 1930
National Register of Historic Places in White County, Arkansas
1930 establishments in Arkansas
Hunting lodges in the United States